Ragnar Sigurðsson (born 19 June 1986) is an Icelandic former professional footballer who played as centre-back. Beginning his career with Fylkir, he went on to represent IFK Göteborg, Copenhagen, Krasnodar, Fulham, Rubin Kazan, Rostov, and Rukh Lviv before retiring at Fylkir in 2021. A full international between 2007 and 2020, he won 97 caps for the Iceland national team and represented his country at the UEFA Euro 2016, reaching the quarter-finals, and the 2018 FIFA World Cup.

Club career

IFK Göteborg
After playing for Fylkir, Ragnar joined Swedish club IFK Göteborg in 2006. He made his Allsvenskan debut on 6 April 2007, starting the first match of the 2007 season. He would go on to play 90 minutes in all 26 of the club's league matches, forming a formidable partnership with Mattias Bjärsmyr as the team won Allsvenskan 2007. He was constantly being linked to several big clubs in Ligue 1, Serie A, Bundesliga and the Premier League. IFK Göteborg's sports director, Håkan Mild commented that the club could get a transfer fee around €3 million for the talented defender. During his second season, Ragnar played 29 matches (of 30) as the team finished in 3rd place. The club also won the Supercupen and Svenska Cupen during the 2008 season.

F.C. Copenhagen
On 30 May 2011, Ragnar signed a four-year contract with Danish champions F.C. Copenhagen. The fee is believed to be around 5.5 million DKK.

FC Krasnodar
On 23 January 2014, Russian Football Premier League club FC Krasnodar announced they had signed Ragnar on a two-and-a-half-year deal with option for another year.

Fulham
On 23 August 2016, Ragnar signed a two-year deal with the Championship side Fulham for an undisclosed fee. He scored his first goal for Fulham in a 2–0 win against Ipswich Town on 26 December 2016.

Rubin Kazan
On 3 August 2017, he returned to Russia, signing a loan deal with FC Rubin Kazan for the 2017–18 season.

Rostov
On 18 January 2018, he signed a deal for a permanent transfer to FC Rostov, the third Russian club of his career, where he joined his Iceland national teammates Sverrir Ingi Ingason and Björn Bergmann Sigurðarson. On 1 January 2020, his contract with Rostov was terminated by mutual consent.

Return to Copenhagen
On 12 January 2020, he returned to Copenhagen, signing a contract until the summer of 2020.

Rukh Lviv
On 18 January 2021, Sigurðsson moved to Ukrainian Premier League side Rukh Lviv, signing a contract until the summer of 2021, with an option to prolongue the deal for another year.

International career

Ragnar was selected for the 23-man squad led by Heimir Hallgrímsson and Lars Lagerbäck for Euro 2016. He scored his first goal for Iceland on 16 November 2014 in a 1–2 UEFA Euro 2016 qualifying defeat at Doosan Arena against the Czech Republic. On 27 June 2016, he scored Iceland's first goal in a 2–1 upset against England in the round of 16. His endeavours in the match resulted in him being selected as man of the match. Ragnar made a last-ditch tackle, described as "outstanding", to deny Jamie Vardy a potential equalizer in the match.

In May 2018 he was named in Iceland's 23-man squad for the 2018 World Cup in Russia.

Personal life

On 5 July 2016, a rampage incident on Ragnar's home in Garðabær was notified to the police. When the police officers arrived to his house, Ragnar had left the scene but the apartment was in a bad state with ruined furniture. In a police report, Ragnar's then-wife asserted that he had threatened her. A few days later, Ragnar was brought in for questioning by the police where he denied all accusations of violence and threatening. Ragnar's neighbours, who had originally called the police, reported the incident the Football Association of Iceland (KSÍ), but no action was taken. The event was publicly revealed in September 2021 when several cases of violence by Icelandic professional footballers were exposed in the Icelandic media.

Career statistics

Club

International

Scores and results list Iceland's goal tally first, score column indicates score after each Ragnar goal.

Honours
IFK Göteborg
Allsvenskan: 2007
Svenska Cupen: 2008
Svenska Supercupen: 2008

Copenhagen
Danish Superliga: 2012–13
Danish Cup: 2011–12

Krasnodar
Russian Premier League: Third place 2014–15

Notes

References

External links

1986 births
Living people
Ragnar Sigurdsson
Ragnar Sigurdsson
Ragnar Sigurdsson
Ragnar Sigurdsson
Ragnar Sigurdsson
Ragnar Sigurdsson
Ragnar Sigurdsson
Ragnar Sigurdsson
Ragnar Sigurdsson
Ragnar Sigurdsson
Ragnar Sigurdsson
IFK Göteborg players
Allsvenskan players
Expatriate footballers in Sweden
F.C. Copenhagen players
Danish Superliga players
Expatriate men's footballers in Denmark
Expatriate footballers in Russia
FC Krasnodar players
FC Rostov players
Expatriate footballers in England
Fulham F.C. players
Russian Premier League players
Association football central defenders
UEFA Euro 2016 players
2018 FIFA World Cup players
English Football League players
FC Rubin Kazan players
Expatriate footballers in Ukraine
Icelandic expatriate sportspeople in Ukraine
Ukrainian Premier League players
FC Rukh Lviv players